Ernst Wetter (27 August 1877 – 10 August 1963) was a Swiss politician.

He was elected to the Swiss Federal Council on 15 December 1938 and handed over office on 31 December 1943. He was affiliated to the Free Democratic Party.

During his time in office he held the Department of Finance and was President of the Confederation in 1941.

References

External links 
 
 
 

1877 births
1963 deaths
People from Winterthur
Swiss Calvinist and Reformed Christians
Free Democratic Party of Switzerland politicians
Members of the Federal Council (Switzerland)
Finance ministers of Switzerland
Members of the National Council (Switzerland)